La Forteresse is a commune in the Isère department in southeastern France.

Geography
La Forteresse is located in the valley of Rival, and is about 550 meters away from Saint-Étienne-de-Saint-Geoirs.

History
La Forteresse belonged until 1929 to the canton of Tullins. Then, on 17 December 1929, it was attached to the canton of Saint-Étienne-de-Saint-Geoirs. Since 2015, it is part of the canton of Bièvre.

Population

See also
Communes of the Isère department

References

Communes of Isère